3-Hydroxybenzoate—CoA ligase (3-hydroxybenzoyl-CoA synthetase, 3-hydroxybenzoate-coenzyme A ligase (AMP-forming), 3-hydroxybenzoyl coenzyme A synthetase, 3-hydroxybenzoyl-CoA ligase) is an enzyme with systematic name 3-hydroxybenzoate:CoA ligase (AMP-forming). This enzyme catalyses the following chemical reaction

 ATP + 3-hydroxybenzoate + CoA  AMP + diphosphate + 3-hydroxybenzoyl-CoA

The enzyme works equally well with 4-hydroxybenzoate.

References

External links 
 

EC 6.2.1